Suzanne Walker is a professor of Microbiology and Molecular Genetics at Harvard University. Her research focuses on mechanisms of antibiotics and antibiotic resistance. She was elected to the National Academy of Sciences in 2020.

Career 
Walker earned a B.A. in English literature from the University of Chicago in 1983 and a Ph.D. in organic chemistry from Princeton University in 1992. In 1995, Walker joined the faculty at Princeton University as an adjunct professor in chemistry, reaching the rank of full professor in 2003. She was the first woman to become a full professor of chemistry at Princeton. In 2004, Walker joined the faculty at the Harvard Medical School.

She was elected as a fellow of the National Academy of Sciences in 2020 and to the American Academy of Microbiology in 2019. She is also a recipient of the American Chemical Society's Arthur C. Cope Scholar Award and the Alfred P. Sloan Foundation Fellowship.

References 

Living people
Year of birth missing (living people)
Princeton University faculty
Princeton University alumni
University of Chicago alumni
Women biochemists
Harvard Medical School faculty
Members of the United States National Academy of Sciences